George Legge, 1st Baron Dartmouth PC (c. 1647 – 1691) was an English Royal Navy officer, who was appointed Admiral of the Fleet by James II in September 1688. However, he failed to intercept the invasion force under William III that landed at Torbay on 5 November 1688 and was dismissed following the Glorious Revolution.

Personal details

George Legge was born in 1647, eldest son of Colonel William Legge (1608-1670) and his wife Elizabeth Washington (c.1616–1688). A close friend of Prince Rupert of the Rhine, Colonel Legge served in the Royalist army during the Wars of the Three Kingdoms and was arrested several times during The Protectorate for conspiring to restore Charles II. After the Stuart Restoration in 1660, he was appointed Lieutenant-General of the Ordnance, a position he held from 1660 to 1670. 

George's younger brother William (circa 1650-1697) was "a wild, profane creature" who allegedly killed a man while still in his teens. but was elected MP for Portsmouth in 1685. His sister Mary (1647-1715) married diplomat and politician Sir Henry Goodricke (1642-1705).  

In November 1667 George married Barbara Archbold (1650–1718), daughter of Sir Henry Archbold of Abbots Bromley in Staffordshire; they had a son, William (1672-1750), and seven girls. His daughter Mary (died 1753) married Sir Philip Musgrave (1661-1689), who served under Legge as Lieutenant-General of the Ordnance from 1682 to 1687.

Career
Educated at Westminster School and King's College, Cambridge, Legge began his naval career during the Second Anglo-Dutch War, when he served as a volunteer under his cousin Admiral Sir Edward Spragge in the 1666 Four Days' Battle. Thanks to these connections, at the age of twenty in April 1667 he was made Captain of HMS Pembroke, a 28-gun fifth-rate, which sank on 11 May following a collision with  near Torbay.

Despite this inauspicious beginning, he was appointed Groom of the Chamber to the future James II of England in 1669, then given command of HMS Fairfax in January 1672. In late March, he took part in an attack on a Dutch Levant Company convoy in the Channel, which was beaten off by its escort but became an immediate cause of the Third Anglo-Dutch War. In June he fought in the Battle of Sole Bay. The following year he commanded  under Prince Rupert of the Rhine in the Battle of Schooneveld.

By 1683 Legge had risen to be Admiral and he was sent out to Tangier with Samuel Pepys to oversee the evacuation and destruction of the ill-fated English colony there.  His last naval appointment was to the command of a fleet in the channel which unsuccessfully attempted to intercept the invasion force led by William III of Orange that landed in 1688 at the beginning of the Glorious Revolution. The same year he was appointed the first Admiral of the Fleet.

Death
Following the abdication of James II, Dartmouth was dismissed by the triumphant William III, and imprisoned in the Tower of London in July 1691. He died in the Tower a few months later, on 25 October, without having been brought to trial, and was buried, as his father had been, in the church of the Holy Trinity, Minories, in London. He was succeeded as Baron Dartmouth by his only son, William Legge, 1st Earl of Dartmouth (1672–1750).

References

Sources

External links
Staffordshire at Sea Website

1640s births
1691 deaths
Barons in the Peerage of England
Peers of England created by Charles II
Lord-Lieutenants of the Tower Hamlets
Members of the Privy Council of England
Royal Fusiliers officers
Royal Navy admirals of the fleet
George
Governors of Tangier
English MPs 1661–1679
English MPs 1679
English MPs 1680–1681
English MPs 1681